Breng is the name of a public transportation concept in the Stadsregio Arnhem–Nijmegen in the Netherlands. 

Novio (a branch of Connexxion) was the operator from 13 December 2009, for a period of 3 years. On 9 December 2012 Hermes, another branch of Connexxion, became the operator in the region and continues to operate as Breng.

See also 
 Rail transport in the Netherlands

External links 
 Breng.nl

Public transport in the Netherlands